The Pewangoing Quarry, also designated 20CX20, is an archaeological site located along Lake Michigan just north of Norwood, Michigan. It was listed on the National Register of Historic Places in 1972, and is included in the Pi-wan-go-ning Prehistoric District.

The quarry provided flint used in tool-making from the Early Archaic through Late Woodland periods.

References

Quarries in the United States
National Register of Historic Places in Charlevoix County, Michigan
Archaeological sites on the National Register of Historic Places in Michigan